Popular Democracy (United Left) was a political organization in Italy. DP(SU) was formed on January 21, 2000, after a split from the Communist Refoundation Party. DP(SU) published a theoretical journal called Democrazia Popolare. The secretary of DP(SU) was Michele Capuano.

On July 17, 2004, DP(SU) merged into the Party of Italian Communists.

Defunct communist parties in Italy
Political parties established in 2000

it:Democrazia Popolare (Sinistra Unita)